The 1995 Georgia Bulldogs football team represented the University of Georgia during the 1995 NCAA Division I-A football season. The Bulldogs completed the season with a 6–6 record.

Schedule

Roster

Season summary

Vanderbilt

References

Georgia
Georgia Bulldogs football seasons
Georgia Bulldogs football